Theodore Edgar Dupue Hackney (June 10, 1888 – October 19, 1971) was an American football and basketball coach. He served as the head football coach at Texas Christian University (TCU) in Fort Worth, Texas in 1919, compiling a record of 1–7. Hackney was the school's head basketball coach during the 1919–20 season, tallying a mark of 1–7.  A native of Springfield, Missouri, Hackney played football, basketball, and baseball, and the University of Missouri.

Head coaching record

Football

References

External links
 

1888 births
1971 deaths
American football drop kickers
American football halfbacks
Missouri Tigers baseball players
Missouri Tigers football players
Missouri Tigers men's basketball players
TCU Horned Frogs football coaches
TCU Horned Frogs men's basketball coaches
Sportspeople from Springfield, Missouri
Players of American football from Missouri
Baseball players from Missouri
Basketball coaches from Missouri
Basketball players from Missouri